Jon Bogdanove is an American comics artist and writer. He is best known for his work on Power Pack and Superman: The Man of Steel, as well as for creating the character Steel with writer Louise Simonson in 1993.

Career

Comics
After attending the School of Visual Arts, Jon Bogdanove's first work for Marvel Comics was Alpha Flight #32 (March 1986). He then became the regular artist on Power Pack as of #22 (May 1986) and would draw that title for the next four years. Bogdanove collaborated with writer Chris Claremont on the Fantastic Four vs. the X-Men limited series in 1987 and with Louise Simonson on the X-Factor series the following year. In 1991, Bogdanove began drawing for DC Comics. He, Louise Simonson, and editor Mike Carlin launched a new Superman title, Superman: The Man of Steel — which Bogdanove would draw for nearly eight years until #85 (Jan. 1999). He contributed to the "Panic in the Sky" storyline in 1992. That same year, Bogdanove and Simonson (along with Carlin, Dan Jurgens, Roger Stern and others) were the architects of The Death of Superman storyline, in which Superman died and was resurrected. It was during that storyline, in The Adventures of Superman #500 (June 1993), that Simonson and Bogdanove introduced their character Steel, who graduated to his own title in February 1994. The character went on to feature in an eponymous feature film starring Shaquille O'Neal in 1997. The Bogdanove–drawn Superman: The Man of Steel #30 (Feb. 1994) had a variant edition packaged in a polybag. The logo and all cover copy were printed on the bag and vinyl clings (similar to Colorforms) were included for a do-it-yourself front and back cover. Bogdanove was one of the many artists who contributed to the Superman: The Wedding Album one-shot in 1996 wherein the title character married Lois Lane. After leaving the Superman: The Man of Steel title, Bogdanove drew two intercompany crossovers for DC Comics: Superman & Savage Dragon: Metropolis (Nov. 1999) co-published with Image Comics and Superman / Aliens II: God War (May 2002 – Nov. 2002) co-published with Dark Horse Comics. Bogdanove reunited with Louise Simonson for the DC Retroactive: Superman – The '90s one-shot in October 2011.

Film
Bogdanove has participated with his son, Kal-El Bogdanove, on assorted film projects including Hansel & Gretel (2006) and the Lady of the Isle television series.

Awards
Bogdanove received an Inkpot Award at the San Diego Comic-Con International in 2013.

Bibliography

DC Comics

52 #15 (Origin of Steel) (2006)
Action Comics #600 (one page only), #667 (1988, 1991)
Adventures of Superman #480, 500 (1991–1993)
Batman #566 (1999)
Batman '66 #24 (2015)
Batman '66 Meets the Green Hornet  #5 (2014)
Countdown #21, 15 (2008)
DC Comics Presents: The Atom #1 (2004)
DC Infinite Halloween Special #1 (2007)
DC Retroactive: Superman – The 90's #1 (2011)
The Death of Superman #11 (webcomic) (2018)
 The Death of Superman 30th Anniversary Special #1 (2023)
The Multiversity Guide Book #1 (2015)
Newstime #1 (1993)
Sandman Special #1 (2017)
Secret Origins of Super-Villains 80–Page Giant #1 (1999)
Steel #1–3 (writer) (1994)
Steel Annual #1 (Elseworlds) (writer) (1994)
Steel: The Official Movie Adaptation (1997)
Superman vol. 2 #57, 200 (1991, 2004)
Superman vol. 3 #50 (2016)
Superman Forever #1 (1998)
Superman Red/Superman Blue #1 (1998)
 Superman: Secret Files & Origins 2004 (Mxyzptlk story) (2004)
Superman: The Man of Steel #1–68, 75–82, 85, #0, 134 (1991–1999, 2003)
Superman: The Wedding Album # (1996)
Who's Who in the DC Universe #11–13 (1991)
Who's Who in the DC Universe Update 1993 #1–2 (1992–1993)
Who's Who Update '87 #5 (1987)

DC Comics and Dark Horse Comics
 Superman/Aliens II: God War #1–4 (2002)

DC Comics and Image Comics
Superman & Savage Dragon: Metropolis #1 (1999)

Malibu Comics 

 Firearm #5 (1994)

Marvel Comics
   	
Adventures in Reading Starring the Amazing Spider-Man #1 (promo) (1990) 
Alpha Flight #32 (1986)
Fantastic Four vs. the X-Men #1–4 (1987)
The Incredible Hulk vol. 3 #33 (2001)
New Mutants Annual #5, 7 (1989–1991)
Official Handbook of the Marvel Universe #7, 10, 12 (1986)
 Power Pack #22–27, 29, 31–33, 35–36, 42–44, 47–49, 54 (1986–1990)
 Solomon Kaine #5 (1986)
What The--?! #1, 8 (1988–1990)
X-Factor #58, 60–62, Annual #4–5 (1989–1991)
X-Terminators #1–4 (1988–1989)

Storm King Comics 

 John Carpenter's Tales for a HalloweeNight vol. 1–3 (2015–2017)

References

External links

Jon Bogdanove at the Lambiek Comiclopedia
Jon Bogdanove at Mike's Amazing World of Comics
Jon Bogdanove at the Unofficial Handbook of Marvel Comics Creators
Jon Bogdanove on Twitter

1958 births
20th-century American artists
American comics artists
American comics writers
Comics inkers
DC Comics people
Inkpot Award winners
Living people
Marvel Comics people
School of Visual Arts alumni